Reliance Nippon Life Insurance Company (RNLI) is one of the life insurance companies in India. The firm offers life insurance products targeted at individuals and groups, catering to four distinct segments: protection, children, retirement and investment plans.

History 

The company offers life insurance products aimed at individuals and groups broadly classified into four distinct segments: protection, children, retirement and investment plans. Till year 2014 it was ranked amongst the top five private sector life insurance companies in terms of individual weighted received premium (WRP) and new business WRP and had over 1 crore policy holders with a strong distribution network of over 900 branches and around 100,000 agents.

Description 
As of 31 March 2013, the Total Premium (net of re-insurance) was Rs. 40.15 billion, whereas new business premium stood at Rs. 13.77 billion. The company achieved a profit of Rs. 3.80 billion. The company sold 760,000 policies during 2012–13 with total managed funds valuing to Rs. 181.89 billion, through a wide network of distribution with 1,230 offices and over  advisors.

Reliance Nippon Life Insurance is a part of Reliance Capital of the Reliance Anil Dhirubhai Ambani Group.

Important landmarks

Some of the important landmarks achieved by the company are:

2010 - Achieves status as largest private insurer in number of policies.

2008 - Establishes as 4th largest private insurer.

2006 - Renamed to Reliance Life Insurance Co Ltd.

2005 - Acquires AMP Sanmar.

2001 - 	Incorporation of AMP Sanmar Life Insurance Company.

See also
 Nippon Life

References

External links 
 

Financial services companies established in 2001
Life insurance companies of India
Financial services companies based in Mumbai
Reliance Group
Nippon Life
2001 establishments in Maharashtra